Enda Anthony McDermott (born 1 December 1945) is a former Irish cricketer.  McDermott was a left-handed batsman.  He was born in Dublin, County Dublin.

McDermott made a single first-class appearance for Ireland in 1982 against Scotland.  In his only first-class match he scored 18 runs in two innings, at a batting average of 9.00 and a high score of 18.  McDermott later represented Ireland in a single List A match against Northamptonshire in the 1982 NatWest Trophy.  He scored just 9 runs in his only List A match, before being dismissed by David Steele.

References

External links
Enda McDermott at Cricinfo
Enda McDermott at CricketArchive

1945 births
Living people
Cricketers from Dublin (city)
Irish cricketers